Shatin Centre is one of the main private housing estates in Sha Tin Town Centre, Sha Tin District, New Territories, Hong Kong, which is near New Town Plaza Phase I, Lucky Plaza, Shatin Plaza and Sha Tin station. It comprises 8 high-rise buildings and a shopping arcade, developed by Henderson Land Development in 1981. The address for Sha Tin Centre is 2-16 Wang Pok Street.

History
The estate was designed by Andrew Lee King Fun and Associates, a Hong Kong architecture firm. The shopping arcade complete the renovation in 1997, 2015 to 2020.

See also
 Shatin Plaza
 Private housing estates in Sha Tin District

References

External links 
 Official website

Buildings and structures completed in 1981
Henderson Land Development
Private housing estates in Hong Kong
Shopping centres in Hong Kong
Sha Tin
Sha Tin District